Zhang Yuxuan (born 19 August 1994) is a inactive professional tennis player from China.

In her career, she won five singles titles and one doubles title on the ITF Circuit. On 18 April 2016, she reached her highest WTA singles ranking of 166. On 2 November 2015, she peaked at No. 299 in the doubles rankings.

Biography
Zhang began playing tennis at the age of four. She gained a wildcard to the 2013 Australian Open, winning the Asia Pacific Wildcard Playoff.

ITF Circuit finals

Singles: 8 (5 titles, 3 runner–ups)

Doubles: 3 (1 title, 2 runner–ups)

References

External links

 
 

1994 births
Living people
Tennis players from Tianjin
Chinese female tennis players
21st-century Chinese women